Tebbetts is an unincorporated community in southern Callaway County, Missouri, United States. It is part of the Jefferson City, Missouri Metropolitan Statistical Area.

A post office called Tebbetts has been in operation since 1895. The community was named after a railroad employee.

The Cote Sans Dessein Archeological Site and Oakley Chapel African Methodist Episcopal Church are listed on the National Register of Historic Places.

Demographics

References

Unincorporated communities in Callaway County, Missouri
Jefferson City metropolitan area
Unincorporated communities in Missouri